José Villanova (born 20 March 1909, date of death unknown) was a Spanish boxer. He competed in the men's flyweight event at the 1928 Summer Olympics.

References

1909 births
Year of death missing
Spanish male boxers
Olympic boxers of Spain
Boxers at the 1928 Summer Olympics
Boxers from Barcelona
Flyweight boxers